Laurence Olivier Productions was a stage production company created by Laurence Olivier in the 1950s that also helped finance two films: Richard III and The Prince and the Showgirl.

In 1948, while on tour in Australia and New Zealand, Olivier was fired from the Old Vic. To handle his productions he started Laurence Olivier Productions.

Productions

References

Sources

External links
Olivier Archive. Vol. CMXVI (ff. ).—Laurence Olivier Productions; 1953-1954; Anastasia; Waiting for Gillian; Meet a body. Includes programmes and production stills.
Olivier Archive. Vols. DIX-DXXV.—Scripts submitted to Laurence Olivier Productions.

Theatre production companies
Film production companies of the United Kingdom
Laurence Olivier